The 2013 ToyotaCare 250 was the seventh stock car race of the 2013 NASCAR Nationwide Series and the 26th iteration of the event. The race was held on Friday, April 26, 2013, in Richmond, Virginia, at Richmond International Raceway, a 0.75 miles (1.21 km) D-shaped oval. The race took the scheduled 250 laps to complete. Brad Keselowski, driving for Penske Racing, would hold off eventual second-place finisher, Richard Childress Racing driver Kevin Harvick with 12 to go to win his 21st career NASCAR Nationwide Series win and his first win of the season. To fill out the podium, Kyle Busch of Joe Gibbs Racing would finish third.

Background 

Richmond International Raceway (RIR) is a 3/4-mile (1.2 km), D-shaped, asphalt race track located just outside Richmond, Virginia in Henrico County. It hosts the Monster Energy NASCAR Cup Series and Xfinity Series. Known as "America's premier short track", it formerly hosted a NASCAR Camping World Truck Series race, an IndyCar Series race, and two USAC sprint car races.

Entry list

Practice

First practice 
The first practice session was held on Thursday, April 25, at 9:00 AM EST, and would last for two hours and 50 minutes.

Second and final practice 
The second and final practice session, sometimes referred to as Happy Hour, was held on Friday, April 26, at 9:00 AM EST, and would last for two hours and 30 minutes.

Qualifying 
Qualifying was held on Friday, April 26, at 4:05 PM EST. Each driver would have two laps to set a fastest time; the fastest of the two would count as their official qualifying lap.

Six drivers would fail to qualify: Jamie Dick, Derek Thorn, Jason Bowles, Chase Miller, Morgan Shepherd, and Stanton Barrett.

Full qualifying results

Race results

References 

2013 NASCAR Nationwide Series
NASCAR races at Richmond Raceway
April 2013 sports events in the United States
2013 in sports in Virginia